This is a list of Gibraltar Premier Division football transfers for the 2016/17 season. Only moves featuring at least one Premier Division club are listed.

The transfer window began once clubs had concluded their final domestic fixture of the 2015–16 season, but many transfers will only officially go through on 1 July because the majority of player contracts finish on 30 June. The window closed on 7 September 2016.

Key 
x Pending official confirmation from club

References 

2016-17
Football transfers summer 2016